Asaeli Masilaca is a former Fijian politician who won the Nausori Naitasiri Open Constituency in the House of Representatives for the Soqosoqo Duavata ni Lewenivanua  (SDL) in the parliamentary election of 2001.

Originally from Nakini village, Naitasiri, Masilaca returned to his province to contest the 2001 elections after a successful career with the Fiji Sugar Corporation which saw him rise from a mill engineer to mill manager for the Penang Mill in Rakiraki in a span of 30 years.

References

I-Taukei Fijian members of the House of Representatives (Fiji)
Living people
Soqosoqo Duavata ni Lewenivanua politicians
Fiji sugar industry
Politicians from Naitasiri Province
Politicians from Rakiraki
Year of birth missing (living people)